Sergio Ariel Páez (born 30 March 1981, in Buenos Aires) is a retired Argentine footballer who played as a defensive midfielder.

External links 
 Sergio Ariel Páez at BDFA.com.ar 
 De Casa Amarilla al Mundo at muyboca.com.ar 

1981 births
Living people
Argentine footballers
Association football midfielders
Argentine Primera División players
Primera Nacional players
Boca Juniors footballers
Deportivo Morón footballers
Juventud Antoniana footballers
C.D. ESPOLI footballers
CD Pozoblanco players
Gamma Ethniki players
Pierikos F.C. players
Aias Salamina F.C. players
Argentine expatriate footballers
Expatriate footballers in Ecuador
Expatriate footballers in Spain
Expatriate footballers in Greece
Argentine expatriate sportspeople in Ecuador
Argentine expatriate sportspeople in Spain
Argentine expatriate sportspeople in Greece
Footballers from Buenos Aires